The Transitions were an R&B group formed in the early 2000s in the United States. They were signed to the record label Universal Music Group. The group was hand-picked by veteran R&B artist Michael Bivins. Each member of the trio came to Bivins individually in hopes of a solo contract, but the producer had other plans, bringing the talents of the three together: 
Charles Gator Moore (from Detroit), Rashawn Worthen (from Harlem), and Balewa Muhammad (from Tampa). Bivins initially compared them to a youthful Temptations in early press releases, continually stressing the trio's classic soul approach. They released a full-length album, Back in Da Days, on March 27, 2001. It was released on UMG's subsidiary Uptown Records.

Discography

Studio albums
Back in Da Days (3/27/2001)

References

American rhythm and blues musical groups